The Queensland College of Art (QCA) is a specialist arts and design college located in South Bank, Brisbane, and Southport on the Gold Coast of Queensland in Australia. Founded in 1881, the college is the oldest arts institution in Australia. And has been part of Griffith University since 1991, co-located with the Queensland Conservatorium, the Griffith Film School , and Griffith Graduate Centre. The Griffith University Art Museum, formerly known as Griffith University Art Gallery (GUAG), as well as a collection of galleries known as the QCA Galleries, are also located on the campus.

History

19th century

The beginnings of the Queensland College of Art cannot be clearly set. A School of Arts was established in Brisbane's Queen Street in 1849, but while drawing may have been taught there, a formal curriculum hadn't been set up yet.

In 1879, Joseph Augustine Clarke enlisted the School of Arts President to lobby the Queensland Colonial Government to offer formal drawing classes. An accomplished artist from England, Clarke, had come to Australia via India, where he had taught topographical drawing at the Military Academy in Poona. In 1881, Clarke began giving drawing classes at the Brisbane School of Arts, which was then situated in a refurbished Servants' Home in Ann Street.

The following year, a public meeting was held to establish a Technical School of Visual Arts. The idea won public support and in 1884, classrooms and a lecture room were added to the Ann Street premises. Professional teaching in formal classes and purpose-built rooms formed the new pillars that made the new art school stand as recognizable.

When Clarke died in 1890, the position of Art Master was awarded to Godfrey Rivers, a graduate of the Slade School in London and a painter of international repute.

In 1898, the Technical School of Visual Art was incorporated into the newly established Brisbane Central Technical College, creating its biggest department.

20th century

In 1908, the technical colleges that had sprung up around Brisbane were amalgamated into the Brisbane Central Technical College. This college was given new premises in George Street between the Parliament House and Old Government House.

A shift in emphasis from fine art to applied art saw Rivers resign in 1913. He was replaced by one of his former students, F. J. Martyn-Roberts. By 1916, the Central Technical College had the dual role of training students in applied art and teachers in art subjects, particularly drawing. Martyn-Roberts remained head of the art branch of the Central Technical College until his retirement in 1938. He was replaced by Cyril Gibbs, a painter, teacher and graphic designer from Ballarat.

After the war, Gibbs did much to expand the curriculum. Certificate and then Associate Diploma programs were established and photography and graphic design courses were added. A focus on "useful" as opposed to purely aesthetic art and design ensured that the art branch remained part of the technical education system.

In 1970, painter and critic Alan Warren was appointed director and quickly established a dedicated library and a broader curriculum. In 1974, the college was relocated to its own premises at Seven Hills, which has since closed. Under Warren, the curriculum grew to encompass new media such as printmaking, ceramics and gold and silver-smithing. Film and television and later animation were developed from electives to complete courses. The first Diploma of Arts qualification in Queensland was introduced in 1976.

With the departure of Warren in 1979, leadership of the college passed into the hands of a series of administrators. The college premises were becoming cramped, with close to 1,000 students studying in buildings designed for 300. Despite this, Queensland's first degree courses in art and design were introduced in 1985 and the first postgraduate diploma in 1988. The College of Art became the only institution in the Queensland TAFE system to award degrees and the only remaining TAFE institution in Australia specialising in art education. This set the scene for the separation of the college from the TAFE system, and its incorporation into Griffith University in 1991.

21st century
In 2001, the college relocated to a dedicated purpose-built facility at South Bank. The facility comprises public exhibition spaces, a cinema, conference rooms, a multimedia art gallery and the most modern and versatile studio facilities in Australia.

In 2006, the Queensland College of Art celebrated its 125th anniversary. The celebrations included two exhibitions, "Colonial to Contemporary", one covering the period from 1884 to 1971 and another one from 1971 to the present. Moreover, there was The Staff Self-Portrait Project, as well as the publication "Colonial to Contemporary" on the history of the college.

Galleries
There is a collection of galleries known as the QCA Galleries, as well as the Griffith University Art Museum (which was formerly known as Griffith University Art Gallery, or GUAG) located on the campus.

Description
The college is located within the South Bank parklands, along with the Queensland Conservatorium, the Griffith Film School and Griffith Graduate Centre.

The Griffith University Art Museum, also on the South Bank campus, houses the Griffith University Art Collection, the second largest public art collection in Queensland. The Museum organises exhibitions, educational and public programs, as well as conducting "research, teaching, publishing and dialogue among communities of Griffith University students, faculty, artists, scholars, alumni, and the wider public".

Courses

The college offers a range of courses in conjunction with Griffith University ranging from diplomas to doctoral studies.

Undergraduate
Visual Art (B.Vis.A), Animation (B.Anim), Design (B.Des), Contemporary Indigenous Australian Art (B.ContempAusIndigA), Digital Media (B.DigitalMe), Film and Screen Media (BFScrMePr), Creative and Interactive Media (B.CIM), Photography (B.Photo).

Postgraduate
MA in Visual Arts, MA of Design Futures, MA of Digital Design, MA of Fine Art.

Research
PhD, DVA, MPhil.

International experience
The college has exchange partnerships with a number of the world's leading art and design schools including the Pennsylvania Academy of Fine Arts, Duncan of Jordanstone College of Art and Design, Edinburgh College of Art, and the Alberta College of Art and Design.

Photographic education at QCA

Photographic education at the Queensland College of Art originated from the photographic needs of Commercial Art students attending art studies conducted by the art branch of the Central Technical College in the early 1950s. Photography, as a subject in its own right, steadily grew to become a structured evening studies programme conducted by Jack Geddes, then a technical officer with Kodak Aust.

By the late 1950s, the need for formal vocational photographic education in Queensland began to emerge. This requirement was met with the introduction of a two-year part-time Certificate in Photography course. The period from 1960 to 1970 saw the appointment of full-time photography instructors, notably John McKay, and an increasing demand for education accompanied by a steady though painfully slow accumulation of photographic equipment.

The 1970s witnessed the appointment of a second full-time photography instructor and a move from two dark, sparse and ill-ventilated rooms in the old Central Technical College in George Street to spacious new air-conditioned premises at the Seven Hills campus. The combination of this modern teaching facility, emerging industry support for photographic education and the extensive groundwork undertaken by John McKay, who had travelled through Europe and America gathering information and visiting photographic teaching institutions, culminated with the introduction of Queensland's first full-time, professionally oriented photographic course of study. While previous courses relied entirely on vocational night schooling for employed students, this tradition was broken in 1978 with the development of a two-year, full-time Certificate in Photography which included a provision for specialist training conducted at industrial locations.

During the early 1980s, a three-year, full-time Diploma of Arts (Photography) course was developed to complement the existing Certificate course which continued until 1987 when it was consolidated into an Associate Diploma (Applied Photography) Course. By 1984, the Diploma of Arts course was itself extensively revised, upgraded and accredited to become the Bachelor of Arts (Photography). During this period, the Department of Photography expanded substantially, employing ten full-time and eighteen part-time staff and occupying two floor levels, while the student population grew steadily to stabilise at approximately the two hundred currently enrolled in Degree and Postgraduate programmes.

Overall, the eighties were a time when traditions and activities such as the trade show, conducted at the beginning of each academic year, the (now defunct) annual Birdsville Races excursion and the combined Graduating Students Exhibition and Awards Presentation Night were established.

The Queensland College of Art was the last major tertiary institution to amalgamate in accordance with the Dawkins reform of higher education in Australia. The amalgamation with Griffith University in 1991, which has ensured a continuation of long-standing traditions and the existence of the Queensland College of Art and its constituent departments, only resulted as a consequence of intense lobbying and repeated street demonstrations by committed staff and students.

In 1996, the Department of Photography also embarked on a successful campaign to internationalise its programme, becoming the first non-Chinese educational unit permitted to offer a Master of Arts in Visual Arts Photography course from the Central Academy of Fine Art (CAFA) in Beijing, China. The department now runs exchange programmes with Miami University and Ohio University in the United States and supports a strong international student contingent, in both undergraduate and postgraduate programmes.

Other areas of involvement included support for the now defunct Queensland Centre for Photography, a non-profit organisation formed in 2002 by graduates of the Department of Photography, who identified the need for a Queensland-based organisation similar to the Centre for Contemporary Photography (Melbourne) and the Australian Centre for Photography (Sydney) to cater to the needs of both photographers and a photographic exhibition-hungry public. The QCP, which was located initially in the suburb of Bulimba and later moved to South Brisbane  offered exhibition spaces for photographers, artist talks, slide nights and other photography-related events. In addition, staff of the QCA Department of Photography actively participated in producing work for exhibitions and publications as well as ongoing involvement with industry.

Notable alumni

Anthony Bennett
Gordon Bennett.
Wayne Coles-Janess
Peter Hegedus
Tracey Moffatt
Michael Zavros
The Spierig Brothers

Notable personnel
 Frances Wildt Pavlu, Gold and Silversmithing Department
 Jennifer Herd, convenor, both the Bachelor of Fine Art and Bachelor Contemporary Australian Indigenous Art, 1993–2014

References

External links 

 The QCA Official Website 
 

Education in Brisbane
Art schools in Australia
Educational institutions established in 1881
1881 establishments in Australia
Griffith University
Technical schools in Queensland